Steve Bach (Steven Bach) is an American keyboardist, accordionist, composer, and musical director. Bach has performed and worked with many well-known musical artists from a wide variety of genres, most notably Stanley Clarke, Robby Krieger, Kitarō, Airto Moreira, Flora Purim, and Sergio Mendes. He is currently a Cirque de Soleil band director and is the founder of 8 Keys Records, a self-release label record company.

Early life
Steve Bach (born Steven Victor Bach) was born in New York City and raised in East Meadow, Long Island, New York. Since the age of five, he has been playing the accordion and piano, and was drawn to jazz in addition to folk music.

Career
After studying music theory at SUNY Potsdam and Hofstra University, Bach worked as a jazz pianist in New York City. Bach moved to California in 1978, and in 1979 became a keyboardist playing with Stanley Clarke, a well-known American jazz bassist, and was eventually featured in Clarkes' 1980 album Rocks, Pebbles and Sand. Bach also performed and toured with Japanese-American new-age music artist Kitarō during the mid 1980s. In the late 1980s, Bach went on international tours playing Brazilian jazz with a famed Brazilian duo consisting of percussionist Airto Moreira and vocalist Flora Purim. Bach has also collaborated with Brazilian musician Sérgio Mendes, who crosses bossa nova with jazz and funk. He has also served as a music director for Andy Williams, and also performed on keyboards with Bill Henderson.

In addition, Bach has performed as a pianist with American guitarist Robby Krieger.

With Empire Of The Sun, Bach co-wrote the 2013 hit single "Alive" as part of the album Ice on the Dune. The song ranked #79 on Rolling Stone Magazine’s 100 Best Songs of 2013 list.

In 2014, Bach was nominated for the APRA Music Awards (Dance Work of the Year).

Since 2007, Bach has been a Cirque de Soleil band leader. He continues to play the accordion and keyboards, and still serves as a musical director with Cirque de Soleil.

List of works
Below is a list of selected works by Steve Bach, including songs and albums that he had produced.

Album credits
1980 – Rocks, Pebbles and Sand (keyboardist; with Stanley Clarke) 
1988 – The Midnight Sun (with Flora Purim)
1990 – What’s Inside (with Richard Elliot)
2001 – Ballads (with Richard Elliot)
2013 – Ice on the Dune (with Empire Of The Sun)
2016 – Two Vines (with Empire Of The Sun)

Albums (as primary artist and producer)
1985 – Child’s Play
1985 – Holiday
1988 – More Than A Dream
1990 – Nice Moves
1991 – Zero Gravity
1992 – City Magic
1997 – Now And Then
2016 – 8 Keys (8 Keys Records)
2017 – Bach Solo (8 Keys Records)
2018 – Yes and Know (8 Keys Records)

Songs
"Fast Break (Soundwings)"
"Microwave Popcorn"
"The F Song"
"Cassie"
"Rain Dance"
"In My Dreams"
"Sweet Magnolia"
"I Must Be Dreaming"
"Hometown Girl"
"For a Long Time"
"Three Quarters"
"This Is Not Goodbye"
"Star Gazer"
"Samba School"
"Pearl's Baiao"
"Alive" (co-written with Empire Of The Sun)
"Keep a Watch" (co-written with Empire Of The Sun)
"Just Me and You" (co-written with Richard Elliot)

Books authored
Strictly Strings, Pop-Style Solos and Yamaha Pop-Style Solos book series

References

External links
Steve Bach official site

American accordionists
American jazz accordionists
20th-century American keyboardists
American jazz keyboardists
Jazz fusion pianists